Big Four Mountain is a mountain in the Cascade Range of Washington, located  east of Granite Falls. During the summer, snow-melt streams flow beneath the debris piles and cause caves to be formed in the ice.

The Big Four Ice Caves Trail, a designated National Recreation Trail, (#723) is one of the most popular hikes in the Mount Baker-Snoqualmie National Forest attracting over 50,000 visitors per year. Frequently exceeding several hundred hikers per day, the trailhead's two separate parking areas are often filled beyond capacity occasionally forcing hikers to park along neighboring Mountain Loop Road.

A severe autumn storm in November 2006 caused flooding of the South Fork Stillaguamish River destroying a major footbridge to the Big Four Ice Caves. Estimated repair costs to replace the damaged span were approximately $425,000, and repairs were completed in June 2009.  While the trail is open to the public, the snowfield itself was closed temporarily due to cave-ins and slides which have killed four hikers in incidents in 1998, 2010, and in 2015. Because of the danger, hikers are advised to stay out of the caves and are monitored by forest rangers.

The footbridge's supports were damaged by erosion, resulting in its closure in 2019 for long-term repairs. It reopened in November 2022.

References

External links
 
 

Cascade Range
Landforms of Snohomish County, Washington
Caves of Washington (state)
Glaciology of the United States